Kit Kittredge: An American Girl is the official soundtrack of the 2008 comedy-drama film Kit Kittredge: An American Girl, starring Abigail Breslin, Chris O'Donnell, Joan Cusack, Stanley Tucci, Jane Krakowski, and Julia Ormond, and was released under the New Line Records label.

The original score was composed by Joseph Vitarelli. The soundtrack also features songs from the era, and recordings from Bridgette Bryant, The Puppini Sisters and Renee Olstead.

Track listing

References

2008 soundtrack albums
American Girl
Comedy film soundtracks
Drama film soundtracks